The Green Helmet is a 1961 British drama film directed by Michael Forlong starring Bill Travers, Ed Begley and Sid James. The film is centred on a British motor racing team. It is based on a 1957 novel by Australian author Jon Cleary.

Plot outline
The novel starts at France's 24-hour Le Mans race when British champion racing driver Greg Rafferty crashes his car.  The plot then follows Rafferty as he continues to race while also concealing his fears.

Cast
 Bill Travers as Rafferty
 Ed Begley as Bartell
 Sid James as Richie Launder
 Nancy Walters as Diane
 Ursula Jeans as Mrs. Rafferty
 Megs Jenkins as Kitty Launder
 Jack Brabham as himself
 Sean Kelly as Taz Rafferty
 Tutte Lemkow as Carlo Zaraga
 Gordon Tanner as Hastrow
 Ferdy Mayne as Rossano
 Peter Collingwood as Charlie
 Roland Curram as George
 Diane Clare as Pamela
 Harold Kasket as Lupi

Original novel

It was based on a novel which had been published in 1957.

Background
Cleary had written a book about Australian politics, The Mayor's Nest, but his English publisher was worried it would not appeal to an international audience, and suggested a book on motor racing.

Cleary and his wife had lived in Italy for a year and became familiar with the motor races there such as the Mille Miglia. He had not written in six months, so moved to Valencia, a small town in Spain where he rented a villa. He wrote the novel in twenty days at a chapter a day.

Reception
The book became a best seller on its publication in 1957. Cleary says Reader's Digest paid an advance of 20,000 pounds for their editions.

Production
Film rights were bought by MGM, who hired Cleary to adapt his own novel. He said, "They bought it on the strength that some American producer who was an alcoholic which they didn't know he'd read the book... This producer said he had something between 20 and 25000 feet of the most spectacular motor racing. And he ran about a thousand feet of it and it was spectacular. What they didn't know was the other 24,000 was just nothing."

The head of MGM's British operation was Lawrence Bachmann. The director was Michael Forlong, a New Zealander from television. This was his first film. "I want this to be an adult film about a sport I love very much," said Forlong. "I want to show why drivers race, why they are frightened, why they can't give it up." 

The star was Bill Travers who Cleary said "was a charming likeable bloke but he was miscast" and who asked the author not to write "any long speeches because I can't handle them."

Travers was six feet four which meant they had to design a car around him. The technical adviser was Stirling Moss. Ed Begley was imported from America. Cleary said Walters was a beauty queen who had been signed to MGM "and she was charming and friendly and everybody liked her, she was an absolute dish to look at...and she couldn't change expression." South African Sid James was cast as an Australian although Cleary says he spoke in "an Afrikaaner accent. They put him in because he looked right for the part and he was always good at working class characters."

Although most of the movie was set in Italy, it was shot in Wales.  It was completed by January 1961.

Reception

Critical
The New York Times called it "a noisy diatribe against speed car racing" in which Travers "looks unhappy" and Begley "delivers every cliche in the script with embarrassing enthusiasm."

Variety called it a "pack of autoracing melodramatic cliches helped by fast action sequences."

Box office
Cleary disliked the final film and said "They got their money back on it but only just." According to MGM records the film earned $375,000 in the US and $575,000 internationally, making a profit of $124,000.

References

External links
 
 
 
 The Green Helmet (novel) at AustLit (subscription required)

1961 films
1960s sports films
1957 novels
British auto racing films
Films based on works by Jon Cleary
Metro-Goldwyn-Mayer films
Novels by Jon Cleary
Films shot at MGM-British Studios
1960s English-language films
Films directed by Michael Forlong
1960s British films